Hillcrest Heights is a town in Polk County, Florida, United States. The population was 254 at the 2010 census. As of 2018, the population recorded by the U.S. Census Bureau is 294. It is part of the Lakeland–Winter Haven Metropolitan Statistical Area.

History

In 1917, the Lakeside Club was built on the south shore of Crooked Lake. A year later, this club burnt to the ground and was rebuilt and named the Hillcrest Lodge. This lodge was well known and many celebrities stayed there including Bobby Jones, Babe Ruth and William Jennings Bryan.

In 1923, the Village of Hillcrest Heights was incorporated. A year later, the town's  dirt roads were all paved.

Geography and climate

Hillcrest Heights is located just south of Babson Park and east of Crooked Lake. The town is approximately nine miles south of Lake Wales and five miles (8 km) north of Frostproof. Hillcrest Heights is located within the Central Florida Highlands area of the Atlantic coastal plain with a terrain consisting of flatland interspersed with gently rolling hills.

Hillcrest Heights is located in the humid subtropical zone (Köppen climate classification: Cfa).

Government

Hillcrest Heights has a town council made up of five members including a mayor and vice mayor. The town does not have a city manager and is responsible for the day-to-day operations of the town. Police services are contracted through the Polk County Sheriffs Office Department. The town's annual operating budget is less than $100,000. In the most recent 2009 elections, only the incumbent commissioners qualified and were elected by default.

Annexations
Although the town is only , the residents and government of Hillcrest Heights have been aggressive in keeping the status quo in the town. Although the annexation would not increase the population of Hillcrest Heights, it would help stop development of nearby areas. Many residents of adjacent census-designated place (CDP) of Babson Park, with a population of over 1,000 are also fearful of the Frostproof annexations, and the Babson Park Visioning Group is considering either incorporating the CDP or asking for annexation by Hillcrest Heights.

Demographics

As of the census of 2000, there were 266 people, 99 households, and 75 families residing in the town. The racial makeup of the town was 96.62% White, 1.88% African American, 0.75% Asian, and 0.75% from two or more races. Hispanic or Latino of any race were 1.88% of the population.

There were 99 households, out of which 36.4% had children under the age of 18 living with them, 68.7% were married couples living together, 4.0% had a female householder with no husband present, and 24.2% were non-families. 20.2% of all households were made up of individuals, and 12.1% had someone living alone who was 65 years of age or older.  The average household size was 2.69 and the average family size was 3.15.

In the town, the population was spread out, with 25.6% under the age of 18, 5.3% from 18 to 24, 27.1% from 25 to 44, 24.8% from 45 to 64, and 17.3% who were 65 years of age or older.  The median age was 40 years. For every 100 females, there were 92.8 males.  For every 100 females age 18 and over, there were 98.0 males.

The median income for a household in the town was $60,556, and the median income for a family was $62,143. Males had a median income of $40,833 versus $33,125 for females. The per capita income for the town was $20,802.  About 2.9% of families and 1.5% of the population were below the poverty line, including none of those under the age of eighteen and 5.7% of those 65 or over.

Media

Hillcrest Heights is part of the Tampa/St. Pete television market, the 13th largest in the country and part of the local Lakeland/Winter Haven radio market, which is the 94th largest in the country.

Transportation

 State Road 17 – The Scenic Highway going through the center of town, leading northward to Highland Park and Lake Wales, and southward to Frostproof.
 US 27 – A divided highway six miles (10 km) west of town.

Education

There are no public schools in Hillcrest Heights. Generally students will attend elementary school at nearby Babson Park Elementary, and then go on to Frostproof Middle/High School or take advantage of the Lake Wales charter school system.

Warner University is a few miles west of town.

References

External links
 Town website

Towns in Polk County, Florida
Populated places established in 1923
Towns in Florida